Lagedi is a small borough in Rae Parish, Harju County, northern Estonia. As of 2011 Census, the settlement's population was 953.

Lagedi has a station on the Elron's eastern route.

Lagedi was the site of a slave-labor camp during German occupation in World War II. It was a satellite camp from the Vaivara concentration camp and mass executions of Jews took place in Lagedi.

References

External links
Rae Parish 

Boroughs and small boroughs in Estonia
Holocaust locations in Estonia